Papyrus 27 (in the Gregory-Aland numbering), designated by 𝔓27, is an early copy of the New Testament in Greek. It is a papyrus manuscript of the Epistle to the Romans, it contains only Romans 8:12-22.24-27; 8:33-9:3.5-9. The manuscript paleographically has been assigned to the early 3rd century. It is written in 43 lines per page. The scribe of this manuscript may have also written 𝔓20.

The Greek text of this codex is a representative of the Alexandrian text-type. Aland placed it in Category I. This manuscript shows agreement with Codex Sinaiticus, Vaticanus and other witnesses of the Alexandrian text-type.

It is currently housed at the Cambridge University Library (Add. 7211) in Cambridge.

See also
 List of New Testament papyri
 Romans 8, 9

References

Further reading 
 B. P. Grenfell & A. S. Hunt, The Oxyrhynchus Papyri XI (London 1915), pp. 9–12.

New Testament papyri
3rd-century biblical manuscripts
Early Greek manuscripts of the New Testament
Epistle to the Romans papyri
Manuscripts in Cambridge